The Hadsel Bridge is a cantilever road bridge in Hadsel Municipality in Nordland county, Norway. The bridge carries Norwegian County Road 82 and it crosses the Langøysundet strait between the islands of Langøya and Børøya. Together with the Børøy Bridge it connects the island of Hadseløya and the town of Stokmarknes to the neighboring island of Langøya. The bridge has a total of 27 spans.

The Hadsel Bridge was opened in 1978. It was one of 4 bridges that were built in the 1970s to connect the islands of Vesterålen to each other. The other bridges that were built during that period are the Sortland Bridge, Andøy Bridge, and Kvalsaukan Bridge. Together with the Tjeldsund Bridge near the town of Harstad, these bridges connect the islands of Vesterålen to the mainland.

Before the bridge was built, a ferry carried passengers across the sound between Sandnes on Langøya and the town of Stokmarknes on Hadseløya. When the bridge was first opened, it was a toll bridge, but it is not anymore.

See also
List of bridges in Norway
List of bridges in Norway by length
List of bridges
List of bridges by length

References

Road bridges in Nordland
Hadsel
Former toll bridges in Norway
1978 establishments in Norway
Bridges completed in 1978
Norwegian County Road 82